Marcos Paulo Aguiar de Jesus (born 4 October 1983), better known as Pepe is a Brazilian footballer.

Biography
Born in São Simão, São Paulo state, Pepe started his professional career with Mogi Mirim, then left for teams in São Paulo state, except Brasil de Farroupilha and Cidade Azul. He joined Linense in March 2005, a Campeonato Paulista Segunda Divisão club (São Paulo state 4th level). In August 2005 he left for Cidade Azul, which is from Campeonato Catarinense Série B1 (Santa Catarina 3rd level).

In January 2006 he was signed by Primavera of Campeonato Paulista Série A3., in April he left for Guaçuano of Campeonato Paulista Segunda Divisão.

In August 2006 he left for South African team Wits University. He scored 8 league goals that season. In 2007–08 season, he scored 5 times.

In January 2009 he left for Cypriot team Alki Larnaca. After the club relegated he left for Enosis Neon Paralimni. but he was released in August.

References

External links
 Profile from CIABF (football agent)
 Best Foreign Striker – Marco de Jesus
 Language no barrier for Marcos

1983 births
Living people
Brazilian footballers
Sport Club Barueri players
Clube Atlético Linense players
Mogi Mirim Esporte Clube players
Bidvest Wits F.C. players
Alki Larnaca FC players
Enosis Neon Paralimni FC players
Cypriot First Division players
Association football forwards
Brazilian expatriate footballers
Expatriate soccer players in South Africa
Expatriate footballers in Cyprus
Brazilian expatriate sportspeople in South Africa
Brazilian expatriate sportspeople in Cyprus
Footballers from São Paulo (state)